Rahimabad (also Romanized as Raḩīmābād; also known as Shamūlābād) is a village in Nazlu-e Shomali Rural District, Nazlu District, Urmia County, West Azerbaijan Province, Iran. At the 2006 census, its population was 562, in 138 families.

References 

Populated places in Urmia County